Jordan Faria (born 13 June 2000) is a Canadian professional soccer player plays for Finnish club Musan Salama in the Ykkönen.

Club career
Born in Brampton, Ontario, Jordan Faria was part of the Toronto FC youth system. He played 27 games for TFC Academy during the 2016 season and 2017 season, scoring three times. On 20 July 2018, Jordan Faria signed his first professional contract with Toronto FC II and became the 38th Toronto FC Academy athlete to sign professionally with the club.

In June 2021 Faria joined Canadian Premier League side York United. In December 2021 York announced they had declined Faria's contract option.

In 2022, he signed with Finnish club Musan Salama in the Ykkönen.

International career
Jordan Faria has represented both Canada U15 and Canada U17. In 2017, Jordan Faria was a runner-up for the Canadian U17 Player of the Year award. Jordan Faria is able to represent his native Canada, Portugal and Germany.

Career statistics

References

External links 
 
 Jordan Faria at Toronto FC

2000 births
Living people
Association football midfielders
Canadian soccer players
Soccer players from Brampton
Canadian people of Portuguese descent
Canadian people of German descent
Toronto FC players
Toronto FC II players
York United FC players
League1 Ontario players
USL Championship players
USL League One players
Canadian Premier League players
Musan Salama players
Ykkönen players